Peducha is a village in Kohima district of Nagaland state of India. The total population of the village is about 1,087.

References

Villages in Kohima district